Notorious is the eighth studio album by Joan Jett and the Blackhearts. The album was released in 1991.

"Backlash" was the label's first choice for a single, but the resulting one-track CD was only available as a promotional item sent to DJs. "Don't Surrender" was released in the US as a CD single accompanied by a remix ("The Most Excellent Mix") and the non-LP track "Misunderstood". "Wait for Me", a song Jett wrote when she was just 16, was a cover of The Runaways' version from their 1977 album Waitin' for the Night. "I Want You" was a revised version of a song from 1979 that Jett and Kenny Laguna had written for a movie she was set to star in. The original lyrics (which can be heard on the fan-club only CD 1979) were nihilistic and raw, whereas the version heard on Notorious is politically correct.

Several editions of the album feature "Machismo" before "Goodbye", but this is the only difference.

"I Want You", as well as other songs by Joan Jett and the Blackhearts, was featured in Floria Sigismondi's 2010 biopic film The Runaways, but they were not included on the soundtrack album of the film.

Track listing

Personnel

The Blackhearts
Joan Jett - rhythm guitars, lead vocals, co-producer
Ricky Byrd - lead guitars, backing vocals
Phil Feit - bass, backing vocals
Thommy Price - drums

Additional musicians
Paul Westerberg - guitar, vocals on "Backlash"
Manny Caiati - bass, backing vocals on "The Only Good Thing (You Ever Said Was Goodbye)" and "Machismo"
The Uptown Horns:
Crispin Choe - baritone saxophone
Robert Funk - trombone
Arno Hecht - tenor saxophone
Paul Litteral – trumpet
The Federal Strings - strings

Production
Kenny Laguna - producer on all tracks
Phil Ramone - producer on track 3
Thom Panunzio - co-producer, engineer, mixing
Thom Cadley, Carl Glanville, Guy Gray, John Aiosa - engineers
Andy Grassi, Bob Smith - assistant engineers
Bob Ludwig - mastering at Masterdisk, New York

References

Joan Jett albums
1991 albums
Blackheart Records albums
Epic Records albums
Bellaphon Records albums
Albums produced by Thom Panunzio